The Four Cardinal Principles were stated by Deng Xiaoping in March 1979, during the early phase of Reform and Opening-up, and are the four issues for which debate was not allowed within the People's Republic of China. The Four Cardinal Principles were one of Deng's Two Basic Points, the other of which was Reform and Opening.

The principles include:
 The principle of upholding the communist path
 The principle of upholding the people's democratic dictatorship
 The principle of upholding the leadership of the Chinese Communist Party (CCP)
 The principle of upholding Mao Zedong Thought and Marxism–Leninism

Such principles marked a relaxation of control over ideology. In stating the four cardinal principles, an implication was that these four topics could not be questioned, but political ideas other than those in the list could be debated. Moreover, while the principles themselves are not subject to debate, the interpretations of those principles are. For example, there has been extensive debate over the meaning of socialism.

On the other hand, the principles were proclaimed as a sign of adherence to the communist ideology, thus paving the secure way to reevaluation of the Cultural Revolution while preserving ideological stability and legitimacy of the CCP as a response to the Democracy Wall movement. The Four Cardinal Principles were enshrined in China's Constitution in 1982.

See also 
 Boluan Fanzheng
 Reform and Opening-up

References

External links 
 Uphold the Four Cardinal Principles

Deng Xiaoping
1979 in China
Ideology of the Chinese Communist Party